John Mallinson may refer to:
 John Mallinson (trade unionist), Scottish trade unionist and politician
 John C. Mallinson, British physicist